Philip F. Oestricher (1931 – December 18, 2015) was an American aerodynamics engineer and test pilot. He made both the unscheduled first flight of the General Dynamics F-16 Fighting Falcon on January 20, 1974 and its official first flight on February 2, 1974.

Career
Oestricher worked at Consolidated Vultee as an aerodynamics engineer on the B-36 bomber. He later served in the United States Marine Corps, where he flew the F-4D Skyray. As a test pilot, Oestricher flew all models of the F-111 fighter-bomber.

On January 20, 1974, Oestricher piloted the unscheduled first flight of the General Dynamics F-16 Fighting Falcon at Edwards Air Force Base, California. While performing high-speed ground tests, Oestricher nearly lost control of the aircraft when it entered a series of roll oscillations. Oestricher elected to take the craft airborne to avoid crashing and remained in flight for six minutes. Oestricher also piloted the F-16's official first flight on February 2, 1974. He contributed to the development of multiple versions of the F-16 and established F-16 safety protocols.

Death
Oestricher died in Fort Worth, Texas, on December 18, 2015, at the age of 84.

References

External links
 

1931 births
2015 deaths
American aerospace engineers
American test pilots
United States Naval Aviators
United States Naval Test Pilot School alumni